The Amateur Motorcycle Association (AMCA) is a non-profit making governing body for off road motorcycling sport in the United Kingdom. Based in Cannock, Staffordshire, the organisation has over 200 affiliate clubs, catering for motocross, trials, enduro and historical motocross.

The organisation is based around amateur riders, with one of the organisation's main objectives being that motorcycles ridden by members and all modified parts fitted are on general sale.

Initially formed in 1932, the organisation was based primarily around the West Midlands, but has since spread across the United Kingdom. The organisation is part of the IMBA (International Motorsport Bond for Amateurs) and some of the AMCA's top motocross rider compete in European championships against European counterparts from similar organisations.

The AMCA also owns several race tracks in the UK, along with ancillary equipment that is regularly used by AMCA clubs to stage race meetings.

AMCA Championships

Championships
Each year Championships are run for the MX1, MX2 and Sidecar classes, usually 8 events with 3 races at each event and with all races counting.

Riders qualify to compete in the AMCA MX1 & MX2 Class solo Championships in local events, usually in the previous season. Sidecars usually go straight through to the Championship but qualifying events may be run should the number of entries exceed the number of Championship places.

Riders must have held an AMCA Licence in the previous season but if room permits new riders may be allowed to ride in qualifying races without having held a licence previously.

Automatic Qualifiers
The top 30 finishers in the MX1 & MX2 Classes automatically qualify for the following years Championship.

Qualifying rounds
Group qualifiers are usually run whilst the Championship is being run throughout the season. Area qualifiers are normally organised after the Championships have finished so as to include those riders who did not finish in the top 20 and wish to enter following years Championships. These riders are not eligible for the Superclass.

Superclass
The top 18 riders from the current Championships for MX1 & MX2 class will be eligible to compete in the Superclass. Riders in this class may ride any capacity machine as it is an unlimited c.c. class. Riders will not be allowed to ride elsewhere on the same day as a Superclass round. Riders who finished 19-20 in the Championships will be reserves.

Internationals
Since 1966 the AMCA has been a member of the IMBA (International Motocross Bond for Amateurs), which includes similar organisations in France, Denmark, Germany, Holland, Switzerland, Italy and the Czech Republic. Most of the countries compete in the 125cc, Open and Sidecar Championships. Most countries run a round (3 races) and all rounds count for the IMBA's European Moto Cross Championships. The AMCA do contribute towards travelling expenses to the meetings abroad and arrange the entries. In addition there are several non-Championship Internationals held during the year and riders selected by the AMCA may receive expenses from the organising club. Over the years many AMCA clubs have enjoyed events abroad, combining the event with holidays.

AMCA International Teams
These are selected from the AMCA's National Championship the previous year as most of the IMBA's European Championships commence in March and usually finish in September. Due to the events abroad plus the AMCA Championship rounds it is too difficult to have AMCA qualifying rounds in the same season, hence the need to qualify the previous season.

External links
 AMCA Official Website

Motorcycle trials
Motorcycle racing organizations
Motorcyclists organizations
Sport in Staffordshire
Amateur sport in the United Kingdom